Bara is a historic village in the municipality of Aračinovo, Republic of North Macedonia.

Demographics
In statistics gathered by Vasil Kanchov in 1900, the village of Bara was inhabited by 120 Muslim Albanians.

References

Villages in Aračinovo Municipality
Albanian communities in North Macedonia